The 1930 Walker Cup, the 6th Walker Cup Match, was played on 15 and 16 May 1930, at Royal St George's Golf Club, Sandwich, Kent, England. The United States won by 10 matches to 2. The United States won three foursomes matches and seven of the singles matches.

Format
Four 36-hole matches of foursomes were played on Thursday and eight singles matches on Friday. Each of the 12 matches was worth one point in the larger team competition. If a match was all square after the 36th hole extra holes were not played. The team with most points won the competition. If the two teams were tied, the previous winner would retain the trophy.

Teams
The United States team of eight was announced in January, together with two reserves. The initial team included Jess Sweetser but he withdrew for business reasons in early April and was replaced by Roland MacKenzie. Maurice McCarthy became the first reserve but did not travel to the UK. Seven members of the Great Britain and Ireland team were selected in March, with Roger Wethered as captain.
The last three members of the team, Campbell, Harris and Lang, were announced in mid-April.
Great Britain and Ireland used the same eight players for the foursomes and singles. Harris and Lang being left out.

Great Britain & Ireland
 & 
Playing captain:  Roger Wethered
 William Campbell
 Robert Harris
 Rex Hartley
 Ernest Holderness
 Jack Lang
 John Nelson Smith
 Bill Stout
 Cyril Tolley
 Tony Torrance

United States

Playing captain: Bobby Jones
Jimmy Johnston
Roland MacKenzie
Don Moe
Francis Ouimet
George Voigt
George Von Elm
Oscar Willing

Thursday's foursomes

Friday's singles

References

Walker Cup
Golf tournaments in England
Walker Cup
Walker Cup
Walker Cup